Kirsty Leigh-Brown (born 13 November 1981) is an Australian gymnast. She competed in five events at the 1996 Summer Olympics.

References

External links
 

1981 births
Living people
Australian female artistic gymnasts
Olympic gymnasts of Australia
Gymnasts at the 1996 Summer Olympics
Sportspeople from Albury
Sportswomen from New South Wales
20th-century Australian women
21st-century Australian women